The 2009 Mini Challenge season was the eighth season of the Mini Challenge UK. The season started on 18 April at Rockingham Motor Speedway and ended on 27 September at Snetterton Motor Racing Circuit. The season featured six rounds across the UK.

Calendar

Entry list

Championship standings
Scoring system
Championship points were awarded for the first 15 positions in each Championship Race. Entries were required to complete 75% of the winning car's race distance in order to be classified and earn points. There were bonus points awarded for Pole Position and Fastest Lap.

Championship Race points

Drivers' Championship

Cooper S Class

Cooper Class

Mini Challenge
Mini Challenge UK